The Uwe Johnson Prize is an annual German literary award. The award is named after the writer Uwe Johnson (1934–1984) and was first awarded in 1994. It is awarded for "outstanding literary works in which there are links to the poetics of Uwe Johnson". Alternating the main prize for a work and the Förderpreis (promotional prize) for the best debut is awarded by the Mecklenburg Literature Society, the Nordkurier (1994–2016), the Berlin law firm Gentz und Partner (since 2012) and the Humanistischer Verband Deutschlands (since 2017). The prize is endowed with €20,000 (Förderpreis: €5,000).

Recipients

 1994: Kurt Drawert Spiegelland. Ein deutscher Monolog
 1995: Walter Kempowski for Das Echolot
 1997: Marcel Beyer for Flughunde
 1999: Gert Neumann for Anschlag
 2003: Norbert Gstrein for Das Handwerk des Tötens
 2005: Arno Orzessek for Schattauers Tochter (Förderpreis)
 2006:  for Späte Reise
 2007: Emma Braslavsky for Aus dem Sinn (Förderpreis)
 2008: Uwe Tellkamp for Der Turm
 2009: Thomas Pletzinger for Bestattung eines Hundes (Förderpreis)
 2010: Christa Wolf for Stadt der Engel
 2011: Judith Zander for Dinge, die wir heute sagten (Förderpreis)
 2012: Christoph Hein for Weiskerns Nachlass
 2013: Matthias Senkel for Frühe Vögel (Förderpreis)
 2014: Lutz Seiler for Kruso
 2015: Mirna Funk for Winternähe (Förderpreis)
 2016:  for Ein Sonntagskind
 2017: Shida Bazyar for Nachts ist es leise in Teheran (Förderpreis)
 2018: Ralf Rothmann for Der Gott jenes Sommers
 2019: Kenah Cusanit for Babel (Förderpreis)
 2020: Irina Liebmann for Die Große Hamburger Straße
 2021: Benjamin Quaderer for Für immer die Alpen (Förderpreis)
 2022: Jenny Erpenbeck for Kairos

References

External links
 

German literary awards
Awards established in 1994